Medjed is a minor Ancient Egyptian deity.

Medjed may also refer to:
 Medjed (fish), a species of elephantfish worshipped in Ancient Egypt
 Medjed (mountain), a peak in the Dinaric Alps near Bobotov Kuk